Gustaf "Topsy" Lindblom (3 December 1891 – 26 April 1960) was a Swedish athlete who won the triple jump event at the 1912 Summer Olympics held in Stockholm, Sweden.

He also headed the editorial office of the sport magazine Idrottsbladet 1915–1934, was secretary of the Swedish Boxing Federation 1921–1929 and 1932–35, was the Swedish boxer Olle Tandberg's manager 1940 and CEO of the famous dance palace Nalen in Stockholm 1933–1960.

References

External links

Profile on databaseOlympics.com

1891 births
1960 deaths
Swedish male triple jumpers
Olympic athletes of Sweden
Athletes (track and field) at the 1912 Summer Olympics
Olympic gold medalists for Sweden
Medalists at the 1912 Summer Olympics
Olympic gold medalists in athletics (track and field)